Aura Center is a swimming center in Tartu, Estonia.

The center was opened on 1 October 2001.

According to the center, they have about 350,000 visitors a year and an average of about 1,000 a day.

References

External links
 

Swimming in Estonia
Buildings and structures in Tartu
Amusement parks in Estonia